Education Without Borders, is a Spanish non-profit organisation established in 1988 and active in Central and South America. 

ESF is a member of the Coordination Development NGO's of Spain (CONGDE), and is subject to the code of conduct which regulates the activities of its member groups. In March 2007, ESF received the classification by the International Cooperation Agency of Spain (Agencia Española de Cooperación Internacional) (AECI) as an NGO specialized in education.

See also 

 Education Without Borders (Sudan)
 Education Without Borders (Canadian organization)

References

External links 

 Official website

Organizations established in 1988
International educational organizations
Development charities based in Spain